Love and Grudge is a 1964 Turkish drama film directed by Turgut Demirağ. It was entered into the 4th Moscow International Film Festival. At the 2nd Antalya Golden Orange Film Festival it won the Golden Orange Award for Best Film.

Cast
 Belgin Doruk as Cahide Ersoy
 Cüneyt Arkın as Doktor Kadri Ersoy
 Leyla Sayar as Nevin Yalın
 Turgut Özatay as Zihni Yalın
 Cenk Er
 Senih Orkan
 Feridun Çölgeçen
 Ahmet Kostarika (as Ahmet Turgutlu)
 Afif Yesari
 Tülin Özek

References

External links
 

1964 films
1964 drama films
Turkish drama films
1960s Turkish-language films
Golden Orange Award for Best Film winners
Turkish films about revenge
Turkish black-and-white films